Nick Anderson is a Pulitzer Prize-winning American editorial cartoonist whose cartoons typically present liberal viewpoints. He currently draws cartoons for the Washington Post Writers Group. He drew cartoons for the Houston Chronicle from 2006-2017, where the newspaper's Web site maintained a blog of his cartoons and video animations.

His artwork is characterized by a painterly style due to his use of Corel's Painter software, which he uses in conjunction with the Wacom Cintiq computer monitor. He has been designated a "Painter Master" by The Corel Corporation.

Career 
The CNN-YouTube Republican presidential debates, which aired on November 28, 2007, used one of Anderson's questions, submitted in animated form.

He is syndicated in 150 newspapers by The Washington Post Writers Group. His work has appeared in The New York Times, Newsweek, The Washington Post and USA Today. He has appeared on CNN, MSNBC, and Fox News' The O'Reilly Factor. Soon after winning the 2005 Pulitzer Prize, his winning cartoons were shown on air by Fox News' Sean Hannity as evidence, Hannity argued, of liberal bias by The Pulitzer judges.

He was president of the Association of American Editorial Cartoonists in 2007-2008.

Anderson's cartoons have been featured in a series of instructional books, The Painter X Wow! Book by Cher Threinen-Pendarvis.

Awards 
Anderson won a Pulitzer Prize for Editorial Cartooning in 2005 for his work with the Louisville Courier-Journal. The judges credited his "unusual graphic style that produced extraordinarily thoughtful and powerful messages."

In addition to the Pulitzer Prize, he won the Society of Professional Journalists' Sigma Delta Chi Award in 2000, the 2011 National Press Foundation's Berryman Award, and two-time winner of the John Fischetti Award from Columbia College Chicago in 1999 and 2012. While drawing cartoons for Ohio State University Lantern, he was given The Charles M. Schulz Award for best college cartoonist in The United States.

References

External links 
  Nick Anderson on GoComics 
Billy Ireland Cartoon Library & Museum Art Database

Year of birth missing (living people)
Living people
American editorial cartoonists
Artists from Louisville, Kentucky
Artists from Toledo, Ohio
Pulitzer Prize for Editorial Cartooning winners
Houston Chronicle people
Courier Journal people